Cathy Allison Corino (born March 31, 1977) is a Canadian retired professional wrestler and professional wrestling manager, better known by her ring name, Allison Danger.

Professional wrestling career

Early career
Corino's older brother Steve is a professional wrestler as well, and while working for Extreme Championship Wrestling (ECW) he introduced his sister to the ECW locker room. Corino befriended Francine, a manager for ECW, and in May 2000 Francine and Corino attended an IWA Reading wrestling show in Reading, Pennsylvania together. ECW alumnus The Sandman's wife Lori (who usually accompanied him to ringside) was unavailable, so The Sandman invited Corino to substitute for her. Corino accepted at the urging of Francine and enjoyed the experience so much that she worked for the same company again several weeks later.

The next month, she joined the Independent Wrestling Federation (IWF) and began training under Rapid Fire Maldonado and her brother in the IWA Cruel School in Boyertown, Pennsylvania. Corino adopted the persona of Allison Danger, a tattooed punk. Her first match was a mixed tag match with Rapid Fire as her partner in Reading. Danger and Maldonado continued to team together, and on March 24, 2001, in Plainfield, New Jersey they won the IWF Tag Team Championships in a four-way tag match. After Maldonado suffered an injury, Biggie Biggs replaced him as Danger's partner. They lost the titles to Hadrian and Damian Adams on September 16, 2001, in West Orange, New Jersey.

Throughout 2003 Danger worked for Jersey All Pro Wrestling and IWA Mid South. Between July and August 2003, she toured Japan, replacing her friend Daffney who had to pull out at the last moment.

Ring of Honor

Danger joined Ring of Honor (ROH) as the manager of the Christopher Street Connection. At the first show she took her first and only table bump at the hands of Da Hit Squad. After the Connection left ROH, she became the manager of The Prophecy, a heel stable led by Christopher Daniels who opposed ROH's "Code of Honor" and was feuding with The Group, led by Danger's brother Steve.

On June 12, 2004, Prophecy members Dan Maff and B. J. Whitmer turned face, abandoning the Prophecy name and firing Danger as their manager. She began feuding with Maff and Whitmer, and placed a bounty on their heads on June 24. Throughout the remainder of 2004 she hampered every action of her former clients, repeatedly costing them matches, and using her control of their contracts to book them in physically taxing matches. Despite her efforts, however, Maff and Whitmer defeated the Havana Pitbulls for the ROH Tag Team Championship on February 19, 2005. Danger then briefly feuded with Daizee Haze before leaving ROH.

Danger returned to ROH at Death before Dishonor III on June 18, 2005, and alluded to the return of Christopher Daniels to the promotion (Daniels was pulled from all ROH shows by Total Nonstop Action Wrestling in 2004 as a result of the Rob Feinstein controversy). She reformed her alliance with Daniels after he returned later that night. From July 2005 until Daniels left ROH in April 2007 she was his manager. The same weekend Daniels left ROH, Danger left as well.

Shimmer Women Athletes
Danger is heavily involved with the running of Chicago-based female independent circuit independent professional wrestling promotion Shimmer Women Athletes. She co-runs the promotion along with Dave Prazak, as well as being an active wrestler and color commentator for the DVDs. Her notable feuds in Shimmer have been against Rebecca Knox, Cindy Rogers, and Portia Perez.

At Shimmer's April 26 taping, Danger suffered a fractured clavicle in the closing moments of a tag-team match with Sara Del Rey against Cheerleader Melissa and MsChif. She missed three months of in-ring action, but still attended the shows, commentating and valeting whenever she could. When she was medically cleared to wrestle again, Danger announced that she was pregnant and that she and husband Ares were expecting their first child in 2009.

She engaged another big feud against Portia Perez of the Canadian NINJAs. After re-aggravating her shoulder injury on Volume 20, she made her return as part of the Volume 24 where she lost to Perez in a Street Fight match. Later in the night, as part of the Volume 25, she teamed with Daizee Haze winning a Tag Team match against the Canadian NINJAs after her pin over Perez. After missing Volume 26 she came back with a win over the Australian Kellie Skater. Later in the night however, as part of Volume 28, she lost against Nicole Matthews after Matthews hit Danger with a belt. On April 10, 2010, at the tapings of Volume 30, Danger defeated Perez in a Last Woman Standing match.

At the Volume 37 tapings, Danger formed a tag team with Leva Bates known as Regeneration X, defeating Jamilia Craft and Mia Yim in their first match together. Danger later received her first championship match in Shimmer when she and Bates challenged Ayako Hamada and Ayumi Kurihara for the Shimmer Tag Team Championship at Volume 45. However, they were not successful in winning the titles. At Volume 48, Regeneration X received another opportunity at the titles as part of a four-way elimination tag team match, and at Volume 52 against Danger's previous rivals the Canadian NINJAs. They were unsuccessful in these matches as well.

On April 9, 2013, Shimmer announced that Danger would be retiring from in-ring action after the following weekend's events. Danger wrestled her final match on April 14 on Volume 57. She and Leva Bates defeated Ayako Hamada and Cheerleader Melissa in a tag team match via reversed decision, when Melissa refused to release a submission hold on Danger. Post-match, Danger revealed that she had suffered a stroke the previous January, after which lesions were found in her brain; though they were not life-threatening, she was forced to end her in-ring career.

Other promotions
In late 2009 Danger made her return for Jersey All Pro Wrestling in their Women's Division. At the beginning she was scheduled to make a comeback against Daizee Haze but she attacked her in the backstage making Daizee unable to compete. She was replaced by Portuguese Princess Ariel but Allison still got the win. On January 9, 2010, Allison lost to Sassy Stephanie but after the match she brutally attacked her injuring her too.

In mid 2011, Danger joined Adrenaline Unleashed Pro Wrestling in Las Vegas Nevada as the weekly instructor for the women's training in addition to the men's/women's/teen wrestling and core training.  There was one very memorable match Allison Danger had with Allie Parker.  During this match, Allison was wearing her trademark spandex tights.  Her name "Danger" was printed vertically on the left side of her spandex tights.

On October 8, 2021, it was reported Corino was signed by WWE as Performance Center coach, after guest coaching at the facility in May of the same year. Joining her brother Steve Corino, at that time trainer and producer, Allison Corino was highly acclaimed on her job with the female recruits; however, her stint was cut short when she was released from her contract on January 5, 2022. In an interview conducted with Renee Paquette in July 2022, Corino stated that her stint in WWE had left in financial and emotional ruin, as taking on the job required her to take on a new home in Florida just after her husband had purchased a new house in the Carolinas to take on a job there. When WWE released her just 3 months into the new job, Corino was left unemployed in a state she had no connection to and stuck in a lease she could not break. On July 9, it was confirmed that Corino joined Maria Kanellis' new promotion Women's Wrestling Army (WWA) as a coach.

Personal life
Corino attended Perkiomen Valley High School in Collegeville, Pennsylvania, where she was a cheerleader and took part in field hockey, softball and track running. After graduating from high school, she played ice hockey for two years.

Corino married Swiss professional wrestler Marco Jaggi, known professionally as Ares, in 2008. She gave birth to their first child, a daughter named Kendall Grace, in February 2009.

In May 2010, Corino launched her own podcast at the women's wrestling website Diva-Dirt.com. The show is co-hosted by her SHIMMER colleague Amber Gertner who appears as the backstage interviewer for the promotion.

Championships and accomplishments
 Independent Wrestling Federation
 IWF Tag Team Championship (1 time) – with Rapid Fire Maldonado
 International Catch Wrestling Association
 ICWA Ladies Championship (1 time)
 New Breed Wrestling Association
 NBWA Women's Championship (1 time)
 Pro Wrestling Illustrated
 Ranked No. 21 of the best 50 female singles wrestlers in the PWI Female 50 in 2008
 Pro Wrestling WORLD-1
 WORLD-1 Women's Championship (1 time)
 World Class Extreme Wrestling / ThunderGirls
 WCEW/ThunderGirls Divas Championship (1 time)
 World Association of Wrestling
 WAWW World Championship (1 time)
 World Xtreme Wrestling
 WXW Women's Tag Team Championship (1 time) – with Alere Little Feather

Notes

References
 Allison Danger at OnlineWorldofWrestling.com 
 Interview with Alan Wojcik
 Interview with Steve Gerweck
 Solie's title histories
 Allison Danger's Japanese Journal
 Allison Danger's podcast at Diva-Dirt.com

External links

 The Allison Danger European Wrestling Tour 2007
 

1977 births
Canadian female professional wrestlers
Living people
Professional wrestlers from Manitoba
Professional wrestling managers and valets
Sportspeople from Winnipeg
Shimmer Women Athletes
Professional wrestling promoters
21st-century professional wrestlers